Héctor García may refer to:

Politicians
Héctor García-Godoy (1921–1970), politician from the Dominican Republic
Héctor García Ribeyro (1909–1963), Peruvian politician
Héctor García García (born 1963), Mexican politician

Sportspeople
Héctor García Otero (1926 — before 2004), Uruguayan basketball player
Héctor García (boxer) (born 1991), boxer from the Dominican Republic
Héctor García (Argentine boxer) (born 1926), Argentine boxer
Héctor García (basketball), basketball player for Real Madrid Baloncesto

Characters
Hector Garcia, a character in the Zits comic strip
Hector Garcia, a character in Mortified, an Australian drama series
Hector Garcia, a character in the TV series Between

Others
Héctor García (guitarist) (1930–2022), Cuban-American classical guitarist and composer
Héctor García Cobo (1923–2012), Mexican artist, member of the Salón de la Plástica Mexicana
Héctor García-Molina (1954–2019), Mexican computer scientist
Hector P. Garcia (1914–1996), Mexican-American physician
Héctor García Puigcerver (born 1981), Spanish writer